Clowns Lounge is the thirteenth studio album by Enuff Z'Nuff. It is mainly an archival release that features previously unreleased demo songs of their recording sessions from 1988-1989 in Wisconsin, back when the band was creating their first self-titled release on ATCO Records. The title of the album is a reference to a strip club they frequented in-between sessions. The songs mostly feature singer Donnie Vie and bassist Chip Z'Nuff, along with guitarist Derek Frigo and drummer Vikki Foxx. One newly recorded song, "Dog On a Bone," has bassist Z'Nuff on lead vocals but with no involvement from Vie.  Another song, "The Devil Of Shakespeare," was originally recorded around 2004, co-written by author Billy McCarthy for his debut book of the same name. That track features McCarthy on drums, the late Jani Lane of Warrant on vocals, along with James Young of Styx on lead guitar.

On October 12, the first promotional song "Rockabye Dreamland" officially appeared on Spotify and other streaming services such as YouTube. A second song, "She Makes It Harder," was also released to streaming services on October 24, as well as a 3rd track, "Good Luv," on November 7.

The first video and single, "Dog On a Bone," was released on November 21.

Track listing

Personnel
Donnie Vie – Vocals, Guitars, Piano
Chip Z'Nuff – Vocals, Bass Guitar
Derek Frigo - Lead Guitar
Vikki Foxx - Drums

Additional personnel
Jani Lane - Lead vocals on Track 6
James "JY" Young  - Lead guitar on Track 6
Ron Flynt - Keyboards on Track 6
Johnny Monaco - Vocals on Track 6
Billy McCarthy - Drums on Track 6

Release history

References 

Enuff Z'nuff albums
2016 albums